Judd Blackwater (born June 22, 1987) is a Canadian professional ice hockey player. He is currently playing for Heilbronner Falken of the DEL2.

Playing career
Prior to turning professional, Blackwater played major junior hockey in the Western Hockey League, winning the 2008 Memorial Cup as a member of the Spokane Chiefs. He has played in the American Hockey League with the Rockford IceHogs, Rochester Americans and the Abbotsford Heat.

On August 27, 2013, Blackwater agreed to his first European contract, signing a one-year deal with Slovenian club, HDD Olimpija Ljubljana of the Austrian Hockey League.

In the following 2014–15 season, Blackwater returned to the North American minor leagues in signing a one-year contract with the Ontario Reign of the ECHL on October 3, 2014.

On June 22, 2015, Blackwater returned to the EBEL, signing a one-year contract with Hungarian club, Alba Volán Székesfehérvár of the EBEL.

Awards and honours

References

External links

1987 births
Living people
Abbotsford Heat players
Alaska Aces (ECHL) players
Fehérvár AV19 players
Allen Americans players
Canadian ice hockey centres
Fresno Falcons players
Ice hockey people from Alberta
Las Vegas Wranglers players
Lethbridge Pronghorns ice hockey players
HK Nitra players
HDD Olimpija Ljubljana players
Ontario Reign (ECHL) players
Rochester Americans players
Rockford IceHogs (AHL) players
Spokane Chiefs players
Sportspeople from Lethbridge
Stockton Thunder players
Brooks Bandits players
Canmore Eagles players
Crowsnest Pass Timberwolves players
Canadian expatriate ice hockey players in Slovenia
Canadian expatriate ice hockey players in Slovakia
Canadian expatriate ice hockey players in Hungary
Canadian expatriate ice hockey players in the United States
Canadian expatriate ice hockey players in Germany
Canadian expatriate ice hockey players in Romania